Kamal Givens (born March 25, 1981), also known as Chance, is an American rapper and television personality. Givens is perhaps best known for his work in reality television, beginning with his role on season one of VH1's I Love New York (2007), wherein he was one of 20 contenders for the affections of Tiffany "New York" Pollard. On I Love New York, Givens appears with his brother Ahmad Givens, (whose nickname was Real). Givens is also a former Capitol Records artist.

Early life and The Stallionaires
Givens was the second of four children born to Robert and Claudia Givens in the South Central section of Los Angeles, California. Givens was raised on a horse ranch with his brothers, Ahmad, Sean and Micah Givens. Givens, his younger brothers Ahmad and Micah were in a rap group known as the Stallionaires, in reference to where they were raised.

Reality television

I Love New York (2007)
Chance and Real (then age 24 and 25 respectively) were discovered by VH1 producers through their MySpace pages in 2006.  The brothers were among 20 contestants in I Love New York. This Bachelor-style dating show features Tiffany Pollard, better known as New York, in her quest to find true love. Chance was eliminated on the 11th episode, making him the show's runner-up. Chance rides goats on show.  He then later was brought back on I Love New York 2 as a guest to help New York pick the right guy that season.  Chance is also noteworthy, because not picking him was the only regret New York voiced publicly.

I Love Money (2008)
Chance was one of the 17 contestants in the VH1 reality show I Love Money, which features returning contestants from past VH1 reality shows such as Flavor of Love, I Love New York, and Rock of Love with Bret Michaels. The 17 competed in physical and mental challenges en route to a grand prize of $250,000. Chance was eliminated around the middle of the show, after failing at being a "team player" in several challenges and generally being high maintenance.  Hoopz (Nicole Alexander) ultimately won I Love Money.

Real Chance of Love (2008)
Subsequently, VH1 announced Chance and Real were to hosts a new, similar reality show, Real Chance of Love. It premiered October 20, 2008 after a "sneak peek" five days earlier, and involved 17 women vying for the affection of the brothers over the span of 11 episodes. Chance ended up not choosing anyone, saying he wasn't ready to fall in love.

Real Chance of Love 2 (2009)
Chance and Real returned for the second season of Real Chance of Love entitled, Real Chance of Love 2, where they tried to find love, once again, with 20 new women vying for their affection. The second season ended with Chance choosing a contestant named "Hot Wings" over runner-up "Mamacita".

Real and Chance: The Legend Hunters (2010)

A spin-off of Real Chance of Love called, Real and Chance: The Legend Hunters premiered on VH1 on September 19, 2010, and consisted of ten 60-minute episodes that aired through November 24, 2010.

The Next: 15 (2016)
Real made a cameo on TV One series The Next :15 appearing as a friend of Tiffany Pollard.

One Mo' Chance (2020-2021)
In August 2020, it was announced that Chance would be once again starring in his own reality dating show, One Mo' Chance, to air on the Zeus Network. The season aired 11 episodes. On September 29, 2021, season 2 of the show premiered. The 12 episode season ended December 12, 2021.

Personal life
In November 2017, Chance was attacked by a monkey in Thailand while filming a documentary.

Ahmad's death
Kamal's brother Ahmad died from colon cancer on February 21, 2015, aged 35. Ahmad is survived by his widow Raquel, son Mahdi, and other relatives.

References

External links

1981 births
Living people
Participants in American reality television series
African-American rappers
21st-century American rappers
21st-century African-American musicians
20th-century African-American people